Jure Potočnik (born 2 July 1949) is a Slovenian rower. He competed in the men's coxless four event at the 1972 Summer Olympics.

References

1949 births
Living people
Slovenian male rowers
Olympic rowers of Yugoslavia
Rowers at the 1972 Summer Olympics
People from Bled